Augustus John Henry Beaumont Paulet, 15th Marquess of Winchester (6 February 1858–11 December 1899) was a British peer and soldier.

The son of John Paulet, 14th Marquess of Winchester and Mary Montagu, the daughter of Henry Montagu, 6th Baron Rokeby, he was educated at Eton College and King's College London. He succeeded his father to the peerage in 1887.

Lord Winchester was a major in the Coldstream Guards. He served in the Second Boer War, and was killed at Magersfontein, South Africa on 11 December 1899, in a battle where the defending Boer force defeated the advancing British forces amongst heavy casualties for the latter. Lord Winchester was mentioned in the despatch from Lord Methuen describing the battle, as a man who "displayed almost reckless courage".

His remains were transferred back to England, and cremated at Brookwood in early February 1900, followed by a funeral service at Amport two days later.

References

1858 births
1899 deaths
People educated at Eton College
Alumni of King's College London
15
Augustus
Coldstream Guards officers
British Army personnel of the Second Boer War
British military personnel killed in the Second Boer War